There are at least three high schools in the United States with the name Rocky Mountain High School.

Rocky Mountain High School (Colorado), Fort Collins, Colorado
Rocky Mountain High School (Wyoming), Cowley, Wyoming
Rocky Mountain High School (Idaho), Meridian, Idaho